Magicienne was a frigate of the French Navy, lead ship of her class. The British captured her in 1781 and she served with the Royal Navy until her crew burned her in 1810 to prevent her capture after she grounded at Isle de France (now Mauritius). During her service with the Royal Navy she captured several privateers and participated in the Battle of San Domingo.

French service and capture

Magicienne was built to a design by Joseph-Marie-Blaise Coulomb at Toulon. She was the first of 12 vessels built to her design.

She served in Orvilliers' fleet under Chevalier de Boades, and later under Captain Janvre de la Bouchetière  captured her on 2 September 1781 off Cape Ann. In the action the French lost 60 men killed and 40 wounded, including Ensign Dethan killed and La Bouchetière wounded ; the British lost one man killed and one man wounded. She was described as being of 800 tons, 36 guns and 280 men.

A prize crew took her to Halifax, where she was recommissioned in the Royal Navy as HMS Magicienne under Thomas Graves, on the North America station. He then sailed her to Jamaica in December.

British service

On 15 July 1782, Magicienne and  captured three French merchant vessels carrying sugar from Martinique to Europe. These were the ship Tea Bloom, the snow Balmboom, and the brig Juno. Juno was also carrying rum.

The ships fought inconclusively, reducing each other to wrecks before parting. In September 1783 Magicienne was paid off and fitted for ordinary at Chatham on 30 October.

French Revolutionary Wars
HMS Magicienne participated in the French Revolutionary Wars (1792-1802). The ship was substantially refitted at the shipyard of J. Graham, in Harwich being relaunched on Monday 18 January 1793, an event celebrated with a ball held at the Three Cups, Harwich.

On 1 November 1796, Magicienne, under the command of Captain William Henry Ricketts, captured the French brig Cerf Volant, (enseigne de vaisseau Camau), off San Domingo. She was carrying delegates from the Southern Department of St. Domingo to the French Legislature, and hidden dispatches for the Directory General, that a search the next day uncovered. The hidden dispatches violated the truce flag and made Cerf Volant a legitimate prize. The search also uncovered a box of money. Though Cerf-Volant was only three years old, the Royal Navy did not take her into service.

In early 1797, Magicienne captured two privateers named Poisson Volant. One was armed with 12 guns and had a crew of 80 men, and the other was armed with five guns and had a crew of 50 men. One was captured on 13 January, and the other on 16 February. Bounty bills (head money) was paid in September 1827. A later account narrates that Poisson Volant was a Dutch privateer, out of Curacao, and that Magicienne sent her into Jamaica to be condemned as a prize.

In late 1797 or early 1798, Magicienne, the troopship , and the brig-sloop  captured the French privateer Brutus, of nine guns.

After the crew of  mutinied and murdered her captain, Hugh Pigot, in 1797, Magicienne was involved in the efforts to capture the mutineers and bring them to trial.

On 23 November 1800 Captain Sir Richard Strachan in  chased a French convoy in to the Morbihan, where it sheltered under the protection of shore batteries and a 24-gun corvette. Magicienne was able to force the corvette Réolaise onto the shore at Port Navalo. The hired armed cutters Suworow, Nile and Lurcher then towed in four boats with a cutting-out party of seamen and marines from Captain and Magicienne. Although the cutting-out party landed under heavy grape and small arms fire, it was able to set the corvette on fire; shortly thereafter Réolaise blew up. Only one British seaman, a crewman from Suworow, was killed. However, Suworow's sails and rigging were so badly cut up that Captain had to tow her.

Ogilvy described her as a "remarkable fine Ship, fails well, is pierced for Twenty Guns, had Eighteen mounted, but threw them all overboard except Four during the Chace; I think her a Vessel well calculated for His Majesty's Service." The Navy ignored his recommendation.

Napoleonic Wars
On 24 July 1804 , while in company with Magicienne, captured Agnela.

Early in March 1805, Magicienne and  sent two boats each, under the command of Lieutenant John Kelly Tudor of Reindeer, to cut out a 4-gun schooner from under a battery in Aguadilla Bay, Puerto Rico.

In 1806, while under the command of Captain Adam Mackenzie, she cruised in the Caribbean. On 25 January 1806, Magicienne was in company with Penguin in the Mona Passage when Magicienne captured the Spanish packet ship Carmen after a chase of 12 hours. Carmen was pierced for 14 guns but carrying only two, and had a crew of 18 men under the command of an officer of the same rank as a commander in the British Navy.

Magicienne joined John Thomas Duckworth's squadron on 5 February, which led to her taking part in the Battle of San Domingo.

 forced the surrender of the Brave and directed Acasta to take possession of her, whilst the Donegal moved on to engage the other French ships. Brave was one of the three that the British captured, the other two being the Jupiter and the Alexandre.

On 8 February Duckworth sent boats from Acasta and Magicienne to the wrecks. Boarding unopposed, the boat parties removed the remaining French crewmen as prisoners and set both ships on fire. Lastly, in 1847 the Admiralty awarded the surviving claimants from the action the Naval General Service Medal with clasp "St. Domingo".

The convoy cleared the Gulf of Florida. On 10 August a Spanish ship-of-the-line approached but Veteran and Magicienne chased her into Havana. Between 19 and 23 August the convoy ran into a gale that did not fully abate until 25 August. Initial reports had nine vessels foundering, with the crew of some being saved; later reports put the loss at 13 merchant vessels foundered and two abandoned but later salvaged. Franchise lost her fore-mast and main-top-mast but together with Penguin managed to bring 71 merchant vessels back to England. (Others arrived earlier or later, and some went to America.) Magicienne, however, was so badly damaged that she had to put in at Bermuda for repairs.

In December 1809, Magicienne served in the Indian Ocean. During the Mauritius campaign of 1809–1811, the French Navy captured the East Indiaman Windham in the action of 18 November 1809, but the newly arrived Magicienne, under Captain Lucius Curtis, recaptured her on 29 December 1809.

Loss

The summer of 1810 saw a campaign against the French Indian Ocean possessions; The Île de Bourbon (Réunion) was captured in July. In August, attention was turned to Mauritius, where the British attempted to land troops to destroy coastal batteries and signals around Grand Port; the attempt turned sour, however, when two French forty-gun frigates, Bellone and Minerve, the 18-gun corvette Victor, and two East Indiaman prizes entered the harbour and took up defensive positions at the head of the main entrance channel. The French also moved the channel markers to confuse the British approach.

In the run-up to the battle, Sirius re-captured Windham, which the French had captured a second time in the action of 3 July 1810. On the 23 August 1810 the British squadron entered the channel at Grand Port. Sirius was the first to run aground, followed by Magicienne and Néréide. Iphigenia prudently anchored in the channel some distance from the action. The French vessels concentrated all their gunfire first against Néréide and then against Magicienne.

The battle continued without interruption all night and on the 24 August the French boarded the defenceless Néréide. Once the French flag was hoisted on what was left of the foremast of the Néréide, Magicienne and the Sirius began an intense cross fire against their enemies. Still, in the evening her crew had to abandon Magicienne, setting her on fire as they left her. Magicienne lost eight men killed and 20 wounded.

The battle cost the British all four frigates, including Iphigenia and Sirius.

Notes

Citations

References
 
 
 
 
 
 
 Hamilton, Sir Richard Vesey, ed. (1901) The Letters and Papers of Admiral of the Fleet Sir Thomas Byam Martin, G.C.B., Vol. 3. (Naval Records Society, Vol. 19).

External links
 
 Naval Database
 Phillips, Michael - HMS Magicienne (1781)

Magicienne-class frigates
Shipwrecks in the Indian Ocean
1778 ships
Maritime incidents in 1810